Lane is a hamlet in the parish of Colan, Cornwall, England. Its immigrant population is lower than the UK's national average. It also has 20% lower higher and Intermediate managerial, administrative or professional households than the UK's national average.

References

Hamlets in Cornwall